An alternative financial service (AFS) is a financial service provided outside traditional banking institutions, on which many low-income individuals depend. In developing countries, these services often take the form of microfinance. In developed countries, the services may be similar to those provided by banks and include payday loans, rent-to-own agreements, pawnshops, refund anticipation loans, some subprime mortgage loans and car title loans, and non-bank check cashing, money orders, and money transfers. It also includes traditional moneylending by door-to-door collection. In New York City, these are called check-cashing stores, and they are legally exempted from the 25 percent criminal usury cap.

Alternative financial services are typically provided by non-bank financial institutions, although person-to-person lending and crowd funding also play a role. These alternative financial service providers are estimated to process about 280 million transactions per year, representing roughly $78 billion in revenue. Customers include the unbanked.

Alternative financial services in the United States,
 for example via payday loans, are more extensive than in some other countries, because the major banks in the U.S. are less willing to lend to people with marginal credit ratings than their counter parties in many other countries.

In the United Kingdom, alternative financial services include payday loans and money lending, the latter termed "home collected credit", "home credit" or "doorstep loans". Organizations such as Debt on our Doorstep campaign for improved regulation.

See also 

Poverty industry
Loan shark
Overdraft protection loans
Payday loan
Refund anticipation loan
Settlement (finance)
Title loan
Usury
Mortgage discrimination
Securitization
Debt bondage
Debt of developing countries
 Informal value transfer system
 Guarantor loan

References 

Financial services
Microfinance